State of Matter MAAP Racing was an Australian UCI Continental cycling team established in 2016, have previously been known as Charter Mason Giant Racing.

The disbanded at the end of the 2016 season.

Team roster

Major wins
2016
 National Criterium Championships, Jesse Kerrison
Stage 5 New Zealand Cycle Classic, Michael Cuming
Stage 1 Tour de Kumano, Jesse Kerrison

References

UCI Continental Teams (Oceania)
Cycling teams established in 2015
Cycling teams based in Australia
2015 establishments in Australia
Defunct cycling teams based in Australia